Carex madrensis is a tussock-forming species of perennial sedge in the family Cyperaceae. It is native to parts of Mexico.

See also
List of Carex species

References

madrensis
Taxa named by Liberty Hyde Bailey
Plants described in 1898
Flora of Mexico